

Location
Zadobrova is a part of Ljubljana, the capital of Slovenia. It is a suburb that used to be two separate villages: Spodnja Zadobrova and Zgornja Zadobrova. It is part of the Polje District.

Public Transport
 Zadobrova is served by LPP bus lines 12 and 25.
 The nearest railway station is Ljubljana Polje, 2 km away.

Infrastructure
The A1 Motorway passes by Zadobrova. There is a motorway exit and a junction with the H3 Expressway. Both the A1 and H3 form the Ljubljana bypass.

References 

Polje District
Localities of Ljubljana